Emotional History is MAX's fourth original studio album on original label, Avex Trax. The album comes three years after the release of their last studio album, Maximum Groove in 1998. It is their first album to contain songs written by the group themselves. The first track of the album, "But My Love" is a cover of a song by Key of Life and is credited to M&I. M&I is a collaboration between MAX and Issa of the group Da Pump who raps on the song. First press copies of the album came with a bonus track, "Always Love (Groove That Soul Mix)" remixed by GTS.

Track listing

Charts
Album – Oricon Sales Chart (Japan)

Personnel 

 Minako Inoue – vocals
 Ritsuko Matsuda – vocals

2001 albums
MAX (band) albums
Avex Group albums
Albums produced by Max Martin